The Middle East-Africa Rugby League Championship (MEA) is a rugby league football competition for national teams from the Middle East and Africa which is organised by the Rugby League European Federation. The first tournament was held in 2015 as a part of the qualification process for the 2017 Rugby League World Cup, and was followed by tournaments in 2019 and 2020 with an expanded structure.

History
The MEA Championship began in 2015 as a part of the qualification process for the 2017 Rugby League World Cup in order to determine the sole participant from the Middle East and Africa. Lebanon defeated South Africa in both fixtures and secured world cup qualification in addition to winning the first championship title.

The tournament was reborn in 2019 as a championship between select nations in the Middle East and Africa. The 2017 edition featured national teams only from West Africa including eventual winners Nigeria, as well as Morocco, Ghana and Cameroon.

The Rugby League European Federation announced in 2020 that an additional tournament was planned for 2020, and that thereafter the tournament would be held on a bi-annual basis. The 2020 edition will be held at Tuks Stadium, in Pretoria, South Africa and will see the return of current title holders Nigeria, alongside previous participants Morocco, Lebanon and South Africa.

Appearances
Seven nations have taken part in the three MEA Championships held to date:
  - 1 appearance
  - 1 appearance
  - 2 appearance
  - 1 appearance
  - 2 appearance
  - 2 appearance
  - 1 appearance

Results

Results by nation

See also

Rugby League International Federation

Notes

References

External links

MEA Rugby League Championship
MEA Rugby League Championship
MEA Rugby League Championship
Rugby league international tournaments
Rugby league in Africa
European rugby league competitions